"Sally G" is a song written by Paul and Linda McCartney and performed by Paul McCartney and Wings. It was released as the B-side to the single "Junior's Farm" in October 1974.

Writing, recording and release
McCartney composed the song during Wings' stay in Nashville, Tennessee after visiting a country music club in Printer's Alley. Like the A-side, it was recorded in Nashville in July 1974 during the same visit. The song has a strong country influence and includes contributions from Nashville session musicians Vassar Clements, Lloyd Green and Johnny Gimble, supporting Wings. 
 
In the US, "Sally G" charted separately from "Junior's Farm" on Billboards country chart and Hot 100, peaking at number 51 and number 39 respectively (number 17 when still listed with "Junior's Farm"). On the Easy Listening chart, it reached number 7. The song's debut album release was as a bonus track on the CD version of Wings at the Speed of Sound.

Personnel

Paul McCartney – vocals, acoustic guitar
Linda McCartney – backing vocals
Denny Laine – backing vocals
Jimmy McCulloch – acoustic guitar
Geoff Britton – drums
Lloyd Green – dobro, pedal steel guitar
Bob Wills – violin
Johnny Gimble – violin

Chart performance

Year-end charts

Notes

1974 songs
Paul McCartney songs
Paul McCartney and Wings songs
Songs written by Paul McCartney
Song recordings produced by Paul McCartney
Music published by MPL Music Publishing